Elections for the Indian state of Jammu and Kashmir were held over seven days in November and December 2008. The previous government led by the Jammu and Kashmir People's Democratic Party (PDP) in coalition with the Indian National Congress (INC) collapsed when the PDP withdrew. Following the election, the Jammu & Kashmir National Conference (NC) agreed on a coalition with Congress and their leader, Omar Abdullah became the state's youngest-ever Chief Minister at 38.

Background 

Elections for the Jammu and Kashmir state Assembly were due in 2008, following the end of the term of the Assembly elected in 2002. However, the PDP withdrew from the INC-led state government in protest at the Amarnath land transfer decision. The INC government resigned in July 2008 and the state was brought under the direct rule of the central government pending the elections.

Boycott
The main Kashmiri separatist group, the All Parties Hurriyat Conference called on Kashmiris to boycott the elections, saying the elections were a "futile exercise" that would never "fulfill the aspirations of the people".

Despite these boycott calls, NC leaders claimed that activists from Jamaat-e-Islami had come out and voted for the PDP.

There were scattered separatist protests throughout the elections, including hundreds who protested in Srinagar. Police prevented these protestors from marching to the center of the city which led to protestors throwing stones at the police who fired tear gas and used baton charges.

Security
Indian election officials voiced major concerns about the security of the elections given the calls for a boycott and protest from separatist leaders and the recent violence over the Amarnath land transfer controversy.  Voting was staggered so that security forces could maintain control. Thousands of security forces were deployed during the voting. In Srinagar, security forces were posted at junctions, patrolled the streets, and guarded polling stations. An unofficial curfew was enforced,  gatherings of more than five people banned and neighborhoods were sealed off with steel barricades and razor wire.

Police also arrested three men they accused of being Jaish-e-Mohammed members planning suicide attacks in Jammu. One of those arrested was a soldier in the Army of Pakistan, who Pakistan said had deserted in 2006. However following the polls the NC leader, Farooq Abdullah, thanked the Pakistan government for their "non-interference" with the polls.

Results
The seven stages of the elections were held as follows:

Turnout rose by 17%, despite calls from Kashmiri separatists and Pakistan for Kashmiris to boycott the election. INC head Sonia Gandhi described the polls as "a triumph of Indian democracy".

Separatist supporters were said to have backed the PDP. The BJP's increase in support was said to be due to polarisation arising from the Amarnath land transfer controversy, which led it to increase its seat tally from 1 to 11 seats.

1,354 candidates stood for election including 517 independents and nominees from 43 political parties.

Summary

|-
!colspan=10|
|-
! style="background-color:#E9E9E9;text-align:center;" |Party
! style="background-color:#E9E9E9;text-align:center;" |Flag
! style="background-color:#E9E9E9;text-align:center;" |Seats
! style="background-color:#E9E9E9;text-align:center;" |+/–
|-
| style="text-align:left;" |National Conference
| style="text-align:left;" |
| style="text-align:right;vertical-align:top;" | 28
| style="text-align:right;vertical-align:top;" | 0
|-
| style="text-align:left;" |People's Democratic Party
| style="text-align:left;" |
| style="text-align:right;vertical-align:top;" | 21
| style="text-align:right;vertical-align:top;" | +5
|-
| style="text-align:left;" |Indian National Congress 
| style="text-align:left;" |
| style="text-align:right;vertical-align:top;" | 17
| style="text-align:right;vertical-align:top;" | -3
|-
| style="text-align:left;" |Bharatiya Janata Party
| style="text-align:left;" |
| style="text-align:right;vertical-align:top;" | 11
| style="text-align:right;vertical-align:top;" | +10
|-
| style="text-align:left;" |Jammu & Kashmir National Panthers Party
| style="text-align:left;" |
| style="text-align:right;vertical-align:top;" | 3
| style="text-align:right;vertical-align:top;" | -1
|-
| style="text-align:left;" |Communist Party of India (Marxist)
| style="text-align:left;" |
| style="text-align:right;vertical-align:top;" | 1
| style="text-align:right;vertical-align:top;" | -1
|-
| style="text-align:left;" |People's Democratic Front
| style="text-align:left;" |
| style="text-align:right;vertical-align:top;" | 1
| style="text-align:right;vertical-align:top;" | 
|-
| style="text-align:left;" |Jammu & Kashmir Democratic Party Nationalist
| style="text-align:left;" |
| style="text-align:right;vertical-align:top;" | 1
| style="text-align:right;vertical-align:top;" | 
|-
| style="text-align:left;" | Independents
| style="text-align:left;" |
| style="text-align:right;vertical-align:top;" | 4
| style="text-align:right;vertical-align:top;" | 
|-
| style="text-align:left;background-color:#E9E9E9" colspan=2|Total (turnout 60.5%)
! style="text-align:right;background-color:#E9E9E9"| 87
! style="text-align:right;background-color:#E9E9E9"| 
|-
| style="text-align:left;" colspan=12 |Source: Electoral Commission of India
|}

Elected Members

Government formation
Former National Conference Chief Minister, Farooq Abdullah, said he did not want to return as it "required the energy of a younger man", and nominated his son, Omar Abdullah, and the head of the Jammu & Kashmir National Conference instead.

Congress debated forming a coalition with either Conference or the PDP. It was reported that the PDP had offered to support a Congress candidate for Chief Minister if they joined with them. However, Prime Minister Manmohan Singh and Congress chairperson Sonia Gandhi were reported to favor the largest party to "honor the mandate" of the election.

On 30 December Congress and the National Conference agreed to form a coalition government, with Omar Abdullah as Chief Minister.

References

2008 State Assembly elections in India
2008
2008